The Grand Mosque of Constanța, originally known as the Carol I Mosque, is a mosque in Constanța, Romania. It is listed as an historic monument by the Romanian National Institute of Historical Monuments.

The mosque is referred to by Constanța's Islamic community as the King's Mosque.

History 
The Grand Mosque of Constanța was commissioned in 1910 by Romanian King Carol I. Construction began on 24 June 1910 with the first cornerstone laid in the presence of Spiru Haret, contemporary Romanian Minister of Religious Affairs; Sefa Bey, contemporary Ottoman ambassador in Bucharest; and the Ottoman consul in Constanța. The project was funded by the Romanian Government and entrepreneur Ion Neculcea, and finished construction in 1912. 

The Grand Mosque of Constanța stands on the site of the former Mahmudia Mosque (Geamia Mahmudia), built in 1822 by Hafız Hüsseyin Pasha and named after Ottoman Sultan Mahmud II. The mosque was officially inaugurated by Carol I on 31 May 1913. During the ceremony, Sultan Mehmed V bestowed the Order of the Medjidie upon chief architect Victor Ștefănescu. King Carol I also rewarded Ștefănescu with a watch.

Architecture 
The mosque was built in Neo-Egyptian and Neo-Byzantine styles with elements of Neo-Romanesque architecture. Its designer, George Constantinescu, modeled the mosque after the Konya Mosque in Anatolia (Turkey). Victor Ștefănescu served as the chief architect for the project. Contractors used brick and stone materials for the mosque proper, and reinforced concrete for the dome and minaret. The mosque was the first structure in Romania to be built using reinforced concrete. The main portal was constructed using stone from Dobrogea, while the door beneath was constructed from black marble inlaid with bronze. The interior columns were constructed from marble from Câmpulung.

The minaret was built in Neo-Moorish style and has a height of 47 metres. The dome has a height of 25 metres and a diameter of 8 metres.

References 

Mosques in Romania
Buildings and structures in Constanța
Mosques completed in 1912
Historic monuments in Constanța County
1912 establishments in Romania
Mosque buildings with domes